The 1997–98 All-Ireland Senior Club Football Championship was the 28th staging of the All-Ireland Senior Club Football Championship since its establishment by the Gaelic Athletic Association in 1970-71. The championship began on 5 October 1997 and ended on 17 March 1998.

Crossmaglen Rangers entered the championship as the defending champions, however, they were beaten by Errigal Ciarán in the Ulster Club Championship.

On 17 March 1998, Corofin won the championship following a 0-15 to 0-10 defeat of Erin's Isle in the All-Ireland final at Croke Park. It was their first ever championship title.

Erin's Isle's Ciaran O'Hare was the championship's top scorer with 5-27.

Results

Connacht Senior Club Football Championship

Quarter-final

Semi-finals

Final

Leinster Senior Club Football Championship

First round

Quarter-finals

Semi-finals

Final

Munster Senior Club Football Championship

Quarter-finals

Semi-finals

Final

Ulster Senior Club Football Championship

Preliminary round

Quarter-finals

Semi-finals

Final

All-Ireland Senior Club Football Championship

Quarter-final

Semi-finals

Final

Championship statistics

Top scorers

Overall

In a single game

Miscellaneous

 Erin's Isle won the Leinster Club Championship for the first time in their history.
 Dungiven won the Ulster Club Championship for the first time in their history.

References

1997 in Gaelic football
1998 in Gaelic football